Sertularella acutidentata is a branching colonial hydroid in the family Sertulariidae.

Description
This hydroid grows to 4.5 cm.

Distribution
Described from eastern Indonesia; collected by the Dutch Siboga Expedition.

References

Sertularellidae
Animals described in 1919